Dantzig was a  74-gun ship of the line of the French Navy.

Career 
Ordered on 24 April 1804 as Illustre, Dantzig was one of the ships built in the various shipyards captured by the First French Empire in Holland and Italy in a crash programme to replenish the ranks of the French Navy.

In 1807, she crossed from Antwerp to Vlissingen for fitting out.

At the Bourbon Restoration, she was renamed to Achille. Found to need a complete refit on 10 June 1816 she was struck later that year.

Notes, citations, and references

Notes

Citations

References

Ships of the line of the French Navy
Téméraire-class ships of the line
1807 ships